The British shilling, abbreviated "1/-", was a unit of currency and a denomination of sterling coinage worth  of one pound, or twelve pence. It was first minted in the reign of Henry VII as the testoon, and became known as the shilling, from the Old English , sometime in the mid-16th century. It circulated until 1990. The word bob was sometimes used for a monetary value of several shillings, e.g. "ten-bob note". Following decimalisation on 15 February 1971 the coin had a value of five new pence, and a new coin of the same value but labelled as "five new pence" or "five pence" was minted with the same size as the shilling until 1990, after which the shilling no longer remained legal tender. It was made from silver from its introduction in or around 1503 until 1946, and thereafter in cupronickel.

Before Decimal Day in 1971, sterling used the Carolingian monetary system ("£sd"), under which the largest unit was a pound (£) divided into 20 shillings (s), each of 12 pence (d).

Although the coin was not minted until the 16th century, the value of a shilling had been used for accounting purposes since the early medieval period. The value of one shilling equalling 12 pence (12 d) was set by the Normans following the conquest; before this various English coins equalling 4, 5, and 12 pence had all been known as shillings. 

The notation  for a number of shillings and pence  was widely used (e.g., "19/11" for nineteen shillings and eleven pence). The form  was used for a number of shillings and zero pence (e.g., "5/–" for five shillings exactly).

History

The first coins of the pound sterling with the value of 12d were minted in 1503 or 1504 and were known as testoons. The testoon was one of the first English coins to bear a real (rather than a representative) portrait of the monarch on its obverse, and it is for this reason that it obtained its name from an Italian coin known as the testone, or headpiece, which had been introduced in Milan in 1474. Between 1544 and 1551 the coinage was debased repeatedly by the governments of Henry VIII and Edward VI in an attempt to generate more money to fund foreign wars. This debasement meant that coins produced in 1551 had one-fifth of the silver content of those minted in 1544, and consequently the value of new testoons fell from 12d to 6d. The reason the testoon decreased in value is that unlike today, the value of coins was determined by the market price of the metal contained within them. This debasement was recognised as a mistake, and during Elizabeth's reign newly minted coins, including the testoon (now known as the shilling), had a much higher silver content and regained their pre-debasement value.

Shillings were minted during the reigns of every English monarch after Edward VI, as well as during the Commonwealth, with a vast number of variations and alterations appearing over the years. The Royal Mint undertook a massive recoinage programme in 1816, with large quantities of gold and silver coin being minted. Previous issues of silver coinage had been irregular, and the last issue, minted in 1787, was not intended for issue to the public, but as Christmas gifts to the Bank of England's customers. New silver coinage was to be of .925 (sterling) standard, with silver coins to be minted at 66 shillings to the troy pound. Hence, newly minted shillings weighed  troy ounce, equivalent to 87.273 grains or 5.655 grams.

The Royal Mint debased the silver coinage in 1920 from 92.5% silver to 50% silver. Shillings of both alloys were minted that year. This debasement was done because of the rising price of silver around the world, and followed the global trend of the elimination, or the reducing in purity, of the silver in coinage. The minting of silver coinage of the pound sterling ceased completely (except for the ceremonial Maundy Money) at the end of 1946 for similar reasons, exacerbated by the costs of the Second World War. New "silver" coinage was instead minted in cupronickel, an alloy of 75% copper and 25% nickel.

Beginning with Lord Wrottesley's proposals in the 1820s there were various attempts to decimalise the pound sterling over the next century and a half. These attempts came to nothing significant until the 1960s when the need for a currency more suited to simple monetary calculations became pressing. The decision to decimalise was announced in 1966, with the pound to be redivided into 100, rather than 240, pence. Decimal Day was set for 15 February 1971, and a whole range of new coins was introduced. Shillings continued to be legal tender with a value of 5 new pence until 31 December 1990.

Design

Testoons issued during the reign of Henry VII feature a right-facing portrait of the king on the obverse. Surrounding the portrait is the inscription , or similar, meaning "Henry, by the Grace of God, King of England and France". All shillings minted under subsequent kings and queens bear a similar inscription on the obverse identifying the monarch (or Lord Protector during the Commonwealth), with the portrait usually flipping left-facing to right-facing or vice versa between monarchs. The reverse features the escutcheon of the Royal Arms of England, surrounded by the inscription , or a variant, meaning "I have made God my helper".

Henry VIII testoons have a different reverse design, featuring a crowned Tudor rose, but those of Edward VI return to the Royal Arms design used previously. Starting with Edward VI the coins feature the denomination  printed next to the portrait of the king. Elizabeth I and Mary I shillings are exceptions to this; the former has the denomination printed on the reverse, above the coat of arms, and the latter has no denomination printed at all. Some shillings issued during Mary's reign bear the date of minting, printed above the dual portraits of Mary and Philip.

Early shillings of James I feature the alternative reverse inscription , meaning "Let God arise and His enemies be scattered", becoming , meaning "What God hath put together let no man put asunder" after 1604.

In popular culture

A slang name for a shilling was a "bob" (plural as singular, as in "that cost me two bob"). The first recorded use was in a case of coining heard at the Old Bailey in 1789, when it was described as cant, "well understood among a certain set of people", but heard only among criminals and their associates.

In the Gambia, white people are called toubabs, which may derive from the colonial practice of paying locals two shillings for running errands. An alternate etymology holds that the name is derived from French toubib, i.e. doctor.

To "take the King's shilling" was to enlist in the army or navy, a phrase dating back to the early 19th century.

To "cut someone off with a shilling", often quoted as "cut off without a shilling" means to disinherit. Although having no basis in English law, some believe that leaving a family member a single shilling in one's will ensured that it could not be challenged in court as an oversight.

A popular legend holds that a shilling was the value of a cow in Kent, or a sheep elsewhere.

Mintages 

Victoria

1838 - 1,956,240
1839 - 5,666,760
1840 - 1,639,440
1841 - 875,160
1842 - 2,094,840
1843 - 1,465,200
1844 - 4,466,760
1845 - 4,082,760
1846 - 4,031,280
1848 - 1,041,480
1849 - 645,480
1850 - 685,080
1851 - 470,071
1852 - 1,306,574
1853 - 4,256,188
1854 - 522,414
1855 - 1,368,499
1856 - 3,168,600
1857 - 2,562,120
1858 - 3,108,600
1859 - 4,561,920
1860 - 1,671,120
1861 - 1,382,040
1862 - 954,360
1863 - 839,320
1864 - 4,518,360
1865 - 5,619,240
1866 - 4,989,600
1867 - 2,166,120
1868 - 3,330,360
1869 - 736,560
1870 - 1,467,471
1871 - 4,910,010
1872 - 8,897,781
1873 - 6,589,598
1874 - 5,503,747
1875 - 4,353,983
1876 - 1,057,387
1877 - 2,980,703
1878 - 3,127,131
1879 - 3,611,407
1880 - 4,842,786
1881 - 5,255,332
1882 - 1,611,786
1883 - 7,281,450
1884 - 3,923,993
1885 - 3,336,527
1886 - 2,086,819
1887 - 4,034,133
1888 - 4,526,856
1889 - 7,039,628
1890 - 8,794,042
1891 - 5,665,348
1892 - 4,591,622
1893 - 7,040,386
1894 - 5,953,152
1895 - 8,880,651
1896 - 9,264,551
1897 - 6,270,364
1898 - 9,768,703
1899 - 10,965,382
1900 - 10,937,590
1901 - 3,426,294

Edward VII

1902 - 7,905,604
1903 - 2,061,823
1904 - 2,040,161
1905 - 488,390
1906 - 10,791,025
1907 - 14,083,418
1908 - 3,806,969
1909 - 5,664,982
1910 - 26,547,236

George V

1911 - 20,065,908; 6,000 (Proof)
1912 - 15,594,009
1913 - 9,011,509
1914 - 23,415,843
1915 - 39,279,024
1916 - 35,862,015
1917 - 22,202,608
1918 - 34,915,934
1919 - 10,823,824
1920 - 22,865,142
1921 - 22,648,763
1922 - 27,215,738
1923 - 14,575,243
1924 - 9,250,095
1925 - 5,418,764
1926 - 22,516,453
1927 - 9,262,244
1928 - 18,136,778
1929 - 19,343,006
1930 - 3,137,092
1931 - 6,993,926
1932 - 12,168,101
1933 - 11,511,624
1934 - 6,138,463
1935 - 9,183,462
1936 - 11,910,613

George VI

Elizabeth II

Notes

References

External links
 Online Coin Club / Coin Type: Shilling – Listing of all issued shillings, with mintages, descriptions and photos

Coins of Great Britain
History of British coinage
Pre-decimalisation coins of the United Kingdom